{{Speciesbox
|name = Tembusu
|image = $5_tree.JPG
|genus = Cyrtophyllum
|species = fragrans
|authority = (Roxb.) DC.
|synonyms =
 Fagraea fragrans Roxb.
 Fagraea peregrina (Reinw.) Blume
 Fagraea ridleyi Gand. Cyrtophyllum peregrinum}}

The tembusu is a large evergreen tree in the family Gentianaceae, native to Southeast Asia (from Indo-China to New Guinea). It is the Malay name for Cyrtophyllum fragrans (synonym Fagraea fragrans).

Its trunk is dark brown, with deeply fissured bark, looking somewhat like a bittergourd. The tree grows in an irregular shape from 10 to 25 metres high, with light green oval-shaped leaves, and yellowish flowers with a distinct fragrance. The fruits of the tree are bitter tasting red berries, which are eaten by Pteropus fruit bats.

Common names
Buabua (Fiji Islands), Urung (Philippines), Temasuk (Sabah), Tatrao, Trai (Vietnam), Kan Krao (Thailand), Tembesu (Indonesia), Anan, Anama (Burma), Munpla (Thailand, Laos), Ta Trao (Cambodia).

Uses
The trunk of this tree can produce very hard wood that can be used to make chopping boards.

The wood can last over a hundred years, particularly as termites and weevils do not eat this kind of wood. People always use this wood for creating the floors of their homes and love to sleep on it.

Cultural significance
The tree is pictured on the Singaporean five-dollar bill.

In Thailand, it is the provincial tree of Surin Province and the university tree of Ubonratchathani.

References

Note: Fagraea cochinchinensis is now considered a synonym of Aidia cochinchinensis''

External links
 
 
 Description from a woods supply site

Fagraea
Trees of Indo-China